Mango-pine is a common name for several trees of the genus Barringtonia, which are flowering plants unrelated to actual pines, and may refer to:

Barringtonia acutangula
Barringtonia asiatica
Barringtonia racemosa